Microcentrus caryae, the hickory stegaspidine treehopper, is a species of treehopper in the family Membracidae.

References

Further reading

External links

 

Insects described in 1851
Stegaspidinae